Werner Kirsch (16 April 1938 – 29 July 2017) was a German boxer. He competed in the men's featherweight event at the 1960 Summer Olympics.

References

External links
 

1938 births
2017 deaths
German male boxers
Olympic boxers of the United Team of Germany
Boxers at the 1960 Summer Olympics
People from Werdau
Featherweight boxers
Sportspeople from Saxony